The women's high jump at the 1938 European Athletics Championships was held in Vienna, at the time part of German Reich, at Praterstadion on 18 September 1938.

Medalists

Results

Final
18 September

Participation
According to an unofficial count, 9 athletes from 6 countries participated in the event.

 (3)
 (1)
 (1)
 (1)
 (1)
 (2)

References

High jump
High jump at the European Athletics Championships
Euro